Sir William Jukes Steward (20 January 1841 – 30 October 1912) was a New Zealand politician and the first Liberal Speaker of the New Zealand House of Representatives. He represented South Canterbury electorates in Parliament for a total of 34 years, before being appointed to the Legislative Council. He served briefly on the Otago Provincial Council and was Mayor of Oamaru for three years.

Early life

Steward was born in Reading, Berkshire, in England in 1841. He was educated at King Edward VI. Grammar School in Ludlow (to which his family had moved, his boyhood home at Numbers 4–5 King Street now marked by a plaque), and Dr Benham's Commercial School in Gloucester. He emigrated to New Zealand apparently on the Mersey in 1862, but his name is not included in the passenger list for the 25 September 1862 arrival.

Family
Steward married Hannah Whitefoord on 4 December 1873 at St. Paul's Church in Dunedin. She was the third daughter of Caleb Whitefoord of Burford in Shropshire near Ludlow. They had one son and three daughters.

Professional career
In 1863, he was working as a draper in Christchurch. From 1867, he was editor of the Oamaru Times in Oamaru. He was later proprietor of the North Otago Times, the Ashburton Mail and Guardian and, after moving to Waimate, the Waimate Times.

Political career

Member of Parliament

Steward and Macassey contested the 1871 general election in Waitaki. At the time, the Waitaki was a single-member electorate. At the nomination meeting, Steward received a slight majority during the show of hands, and Macassey demanded a poll. The poll was held on Friday, 3 February 1871. Steward and Macassey received 188 and 137 votes, respectively. Steward was thus returned to Parliament.

The next election was held in early January 1876. Waitaki had become a two-member electorate, and four candidates put their names forward. Steward and Joseph O'Meagher contested the election as abolitionists (i.e. they were in favour of abolishing the provincial government), while Thomas W. Bislop and Samuel Shrimski were provincialists (i.e. they favoured the retention of provincial government). The provincialists won the election by quite some margin, and Steward lost his seat in Parliament.

Steward was again elected in 1881 to represent the single-member Waimate electorate. The Waitaki electorate had been abolished and the Waimate electorate covered the area of South Canterbury where Steward resided. Four candidates had contested the election, and Steward was returned with a comfortable margin. He held the electorate until it was abolished in 1893.

In 1893 he was re-elected to a reconstituted Waitaki, which he held until 1911, when he was appointed to the Legislative Council.

Steward was elected Speaker on 23 January 1891 when the Liberal Government came to power. The 1890 general election was held on 5 December 1890. Harry Atkinson was the Premier at the time. Traditionally, the incumbent speaker would keep his position, unless the election result was not in support of the incoming government. The 1890 election did not have a clear result and the incumbent speaker, Maurice O'Rorke, lost his seat in Parliament. Alfred Saunders, an independent MP, proposed William Rolleston as speaker, as he had been a long-standing MP since 1868. But Richard Seddon proposed that Steward be chosen instead, which came as a surprise, as the latter was relatively undistinguished. The house voted on the issue and Steward was chosen by 36 to 29 votes. It was the first time that the role of speaker had been put to the vote by the New Zealand Parliament. The election sealed the end of the Atkinson government, which resigned the following day. The forming of the Liberal Party marked the beginning of party politics in New Zealand.

Steward held the position of speaker until 8 November 1893. He had not been regarded as an effective manager of the House and was succeeded by O'Rorke, who had regained his seat in Parliament. However, Steward was to remain as a Member of Parliament until his retirement in 1911. He was knighted in 1903.

Otago Provincial Council
Steward was a member of the Otago Provincial Council from 1875 until the abolition of provincial government in 1876.

Mayor of Oamaru
Steward was Mayor of Oamaru from 1876 to 1879. He succeeded George Sumpter, who was first elected in 1875. The 1876 mayoral election was contested against J. Falconer, and Steward had a majority of 35 votes. In 1877, Steward was returned unopposed. The 1878 election was contested by Steward and George Sumpter, and the former achieved a majority of 45 votes. In the depression year of 1879, Steward did not stand for re-election. Steward was formally thanked at the last council meeting for the able manner in which he had led the council, and the courteous was in which he had interacted with the councillors. During Steward's term, the most significant achievement was the installation of the Oamaru water supply, which resulted in a fall of the death rate from 10.4 per 1000 population to 8.9 per 1000.

Steward was succeeded by Samuel Gibbs. Gibbs had previously been mayor from 1867 to 1870 and was elected unopposed.

Death and commemoration
Steward died in Island Bay, Wellington on 30 October 1912. The body was taken by ferry steamer to Lyttelton, and by train to Waimate. The funeral took place in Waimate.

A plaque in the St Augustine Church in Waimate is dedicated to Steward. The Waimate District Council's district plan has a formal protection for a tree that was planted by Steward on 26 June 1911.
It is located beside the memorial statue for Dr Margaret Barnett Cruickshank MD.

References

1841 births
1912 deaths
New Zealand Liberal Party MPs
Speakers of the New Zealand House of Representatives
Members of the New Zealand House of Representatives
New Zealand Liberal Party MLCs
Mayors of Oamaru
New Zealand drapers
Unsuccessful candidates in the 1875–1876 New Zealand general election
New Zealand MPs for South Island electorates
New Zealand Knights Bachelor
People from Reading, Berkshire
People from Waimate
English emigrants to New Zealand
19th-century New Zealand politicians
New Zealand politicians awarded knighthoods